Kentucky Route 203 (KY 203) is a  state highway in the U.S. state of Kentucky. The highway connects mostly rural areas of Wolfe and Morgan counties with Hazel Green and Mize.

Route description
KY 203 begins at an intersection with KY 191 (Main Street) in Hazel Green, within Wolfe County. It travels to the northeast and curves to the north-northeast and enters Morgan County. The highway parallels Caskey Fork before it intersects the northern terminus of KY 3089 (Nickell Fork–Daysboro Road). It crosses Oldfield Fork and enters Mize, where it meets its northern terminus, an intersection with U.S. Route 460.

Major intersections

See also

References

0203
Transportation in Wolfe County, Kentucky
Transportation in Morgan County, Kentucky